Flixton Road Mill is a tower mill at Bungay, Suffolk, England which has been truncated and converted to residential accommodation. The structure is a Grade II listed building.

History

Flixton Road Mill was built in 1830. It worked by wind until 1918 when it was struck by lightning. Later, it was truncated by one storey and converted to residential accommodation.

Description

Flixton Road Mill was a six storey tower mill with a boat shaped cap. It had four Patent sails of ten bays and was winded by a fantail. There was a stage at second floor level and the mill drove three pairs of millstones. Auxiliary power was by an engine, with the external drive belt enclosed in a wooden casing.

Millers
 Frederick Robert Burtsal 1868-74

Reference for above:-

References

External links
Windmill World webpage on Flixton Road Mill.

Windmills in Suffolk
Tower mills in the United Kingdom
Windmills completed in 1830
Towers completed in 1830
Grinding mills in the United Kingdom
Grade II listed windmills
Grade II listed buildings in Suffolk
1830 establishments in England
Bungay